Deuce, Deuces, or The Deuce  may refer to:

Arts and entertainment

Fictional characters
 Deuce, in the Danger Girl comic book series
 Deuce, a character in Shake It Up
 Deuce, in the Wild Cards science fiction universe
 Deuce Bigalow, in Deuce Bigalow: Male Gigolo (1999) and Deuce Bigalow: European Gigolo (2005)
 Deuce Cooper, in the film Ed 
 Deuce Loosely, in The Sifl and Olly Show
 Deuces, a gang in the film South Central

Gaming 
 Deuce (dice), the side of a die showing 2
 Deuce (playing card), the playing card with the highest value in German card games
 Deuces (solitaire), a card game
 Deuces or Big two, a card game

Music
 Deuce (band), a British mid-1990s pop band

Albums
 Deuce (Rory Gallagher album), 1971
 Deuce (Kurtis Blow album), 1981
 Deuce (The D.O.C. album), 2003
 Deuce (Beautiful Creatures album), 2005
 Deuce (video), a video album by Korn, 2002
 Deuces (album), a 2007 album by Charlie Daniels
 The Deuce, a 2011 album by Stripper's Union

Songs
 "Deuce" (song), by Kiss, 1974
 "Deuce", a cover version by The 69 Eyes from the 1994 album Motor City Resurrection
 "Deuce", a song by The Cardigans from the 1998 soundtrack The X-Files: The Album
 "Deuces" (song), by Chris Brown featuring Tyga and Kevin McCall, 2010
 "Deuces", a 2008 song by Achozen
 "The Deuce", a song by Eagles of Death Metal from the 2015 album Zipper Down

Other uses in arts and entertainment
 Deuces (film), 2017
 Deuce (play), by Terrence McNally, 2007
 The Deuce (TV series), 2017–2019

Military
 Convair F-102 Delta Dagger, or Deuce, a 1950s American interceptor aircraft 
 502nd Infantry Regiment (United States), nicknamed The Deuce
 Marine Wing Headquarters Squadron 2, United States Marine Corps, nicknamed The Deuce
 Browning M2 (Ma Deuce) .50 heavy machine gun
 GMC CCKW 2½-ton 6×6 truck, nicknamed Deuce and a Half, or just Deuce.
 M35 series 2½-ton 6×6 cargo truck, Ditto, inherited its predecessor's nickname.

People
 Deuce (nickname), including a list of people with the nickname
 Deuce (musician) (Aron Erlichman, born 1983), American music producer and rapper 
 Deuce (wrestler) (James Wiley Smith Thomas Reiher Snuka, born 1971), American professional wrestler

Places
 42nd Street (Manhattan), New York City, nicknamed "the Deuce"
 Ann Arbor, Michigan, nicknamed "the Deuce"

Sports
 "Deuce", a score of 40–40 in tennis
 "Deuce", a curveball, or a double play, in baseball

Transportation and vehicles
 Deuce or FXSTD, a version of the Harley-Davidson Softail (FXST) motorcycle built 2000 to 2007
 Bakeng Deuce, a homebuilt airplane of the early 1970s
 Deuce Coupe, a version of the Ford Model B (1932) 
 The Deuce (transit bus service), serving the Las Vegas metropolitan area

Other uses
 English Electric DEUCE, a British commercial computer of the 1950s

See also
 
 
 
 
 Duce (disambiguation)